Hruni is a farming village in Iceland. The small church on the site was built in 1865. There is a folk tale that, when there was merrymaking in the church, the devil came to the party and destroyed it.

References

Populated places in Iceland